Godfried Schalcken (1643 – 16 November 1706) was a Dutch genre and portrait painter. He was noted for his mastery in reproducing the effect of candlelight, and painted in the exquisite and highly polished manner of the Leiden fijnschilders.

Life and work 
Godfried Schalcken was born in Made, North Brabant, the son of Cornelis Schalcken and Aletta Lydius. Before he was four years old, his family moved to Dordrecht, where his father became rector of the Latin school. Schalcke studied under Samuel van Hoogstraten in Dordrecht before he moved to Leiden, into the studio of Gerard Dou (1613–1675), one of Rembrandt's most famous pupils. His earlier genre pictures very closely resemble Dou's work. He worked in Leiden until c. 1675, then returning to Dordrecht until 1691, after which he settled in The Hague, where he continued to paint until his death, near age 63, in 1706. He also visited England (1692–1697), but his uncouth manners and bad temper alienated him from the society there. In 1703 he was employed by Johann Wilhelm, Elector Palatine in Düsseldorf. He died in The Hague.

Work
Schalcken painted several portraits, of which the half-length of William III of England, now in the Rijksmuseum, Amsterdam, is a good example.

Like Dou, Schalcken specialised in small scenes lit by candlelight, a technique that found favour with the fijnschilders. Examples are in Buckingham Palace, the Louvre, Vienna and Dresden.

His painting, Lady, Come into the Garden (Buckingham Palace), was singled out by his pupil Arnold Houbraken as representative of his oeuvre. Other good examples are Old Woman Scouring a Pan and Soldier Giving Money to a Woman (London, National Gallery), Ceres Seeking Proserpine and Old Man Writing (Louvre), Woman (National Museum of Serbia),  Girl Blowing Out Taper (Munich), Girl Reading Letter (Dresden Gallery), The Boy Angling (Berlin); and Toilet by Candle (The Hague). The Buckingham Palace collection also possesses an interior by Schalcken. His history paintings are less-well known. His pupils were Arnold Boonen, Godefridus Callenfels, Simon Germain, Carel de Moor, Richard Morris, Arent Pijl, his cousin Jacob Schalcken, his sister Maria Schalcken, and Anthony Vreem.

In literature

The atmospheric work of Schalcken provided the inspiration for Sheridan Le Fanu's gothic horror story "Strange Event in the Life of Schalken the Painter", which was adapted as Schalcken the Painter, and broadcast by the BBC on 23 December 1979 as part of its Omnibus series.

Notes

References

Further reading 
 Complete text of Sheridan Le Fanu's short story
 DeGroot, Catalogue of Dutch Painters (New York, 1913)

External links

 Works and literature on Godfried Schalcken
 

1643 births
1706 deaths
Dutch Golden Age painters
Dutch male painters
Dutch portrait painters
People from Drimmelen
Artists from Dordrecht
Sibling artists